Streptomyces yerevanensis is a bacterium species from the genus of Streptomyces which has been isolated from soil. Streptomyces yerevanensis produces violacin.

See also 
 List of Streptomyces species

References

Further reading

External links
Type strain of Streptomyces yerevanensis at BacDive – the Bacterial Diversity Metadatabase

yerevanensis
Bacteria described in 1986